Can I may refer to:

 Can I, a 2010 album by Jaicko
 "Can I", a 2015 song by Drake featuring Beyoncé from the compilation album Care Package
 "Can I", a 2020 song by Kehlani featuring Tory Lanez